Upper Mount Gravatt is a southern suburb in the City of Brisbane, Queensland, Australia.

Geography 
Upper Mount Gravatt is south of Mount Gravatt. It has increasingly become an important centre in the last 15 years. Logan Road and the Pacific Motorway run through the area, in addition to the South-East Busway.

Together with Indooroopilly in the west, Chermside, on the north-side, and Carindale in the southeast the suburb has been described as a mini-Central business district (CBD). It contains the State Netball Centre, a major police district station and a regional Australian Taxation Office.

Upper Mount Gravatt has long been one of the major centres outside the CBD, especially for those who reside on the south of the city.

Westfield Garden City, a major shopping centre, is a regional "hub", containing services and popular restaurants, with a bus interchange and the Upper Mount Gravatt Busway Station immediately below it. It is on the southern corner of Logan Road and Kessels Road.

History 
Upper Mount Gravatt State School opened on 1 October 1929. It has also been called Mount Gravatt Upper State School.

St Bernard's School was established on 24 January 1953 by the Sisters of St Joseph of the Sacred Heart under principal Sister Juliana. Mrs Doreen Bazzo was the first lay principal. The first building on the site was a combined church and school, but later moved into separate school buildings.

St Joseph's High School for Girls was established in 1964 in Holland Park by the Sisters of St Joseph of the Sacred Heart. In 1970, the school was relocated to Klumpp Road (onto the site also occupied by St Bernard's School and Clairvaux College) and renamed MacKillop College.

Clairvaux College was established by the Christian Brothers on 1 February 1966 on part of the  site already partially occupied by St Bernard's School.

Westfield Garden City was opened as one of Brisbane's largest shopping centre on 1 October 1970 by Queensland Premier Joh Bjelke-Petersen.

The Garden City Library was established by the Brisbane City Council as one of the initial tenants and the library had a major refurbishment in 1996.

St Catherine's Catholic Primary School was established on 4 March 1973 by the Presentation Sisters. It was officially opened by Archbishop Francis Rush. In 1979, the closure of a nearby school led to a large increase in enrolments. In 1986, the first lay principal was appointed.

In 1985, MacKillop College (a girls' school) and Clairvaux College (a boys' school) were combined to form Clairvaux Mackillop College.

Education
Upper Mount Gravatt State School is a government primary (Prep-6) school for boys and girls at 1899 Logan Road. In 2018, the school had an enrolment of 507 students with 35 teachers (33 full-time equivalent) and 22 non-teaching staff (15 full-time equivalent). It includes a special education program.

St Bernard's School is a Catholic primary (Prep-6) school for boys and girls at 1823 Logan Road. In 2018, the school had an enrolment of 366 students with 28 teachers (23 full-time equivalent) and 19 non-teaching staff (9 full-time equivalent).

St Catherine's Catholic Primary School is a Catholic primary (Prep-6) school for boys and girls at 388 Newnham Road. In 2018, the school had an enrolment of 512 students with 35 teachers (30 full-time equivalent) and 20 non-teaching staff (13 full-time equivalent).

Clairvaux Mackillop College is a Catholic secondary (7-12) school for boys and girls at Klumpp Road. In 2018, the school had an enrolment of 1,265 students with 110 teachers (106 full-time equivalent) and 52 non-teaching staff (43 full-time equivalent).

There is no government secondary school in Upper Mount Gravatt. The nearest government secondary schools are Mount Gravatt State High School in neighbouring Mount Gravatt to the north-west, Mansfield State High School in neighbouring Mansfield to the north-east, and MacGregor State High School in neighbouring MacGregor to the south-west.

Amenities 

The Brisbane City Council operates a public library at Westfield Garden City.

Upper Mount Gravatt is also home to the Mount Gravatt Vultures, a Queensland Australian Football League Club on Klumpp Road. The club were premiers in 2007. 

There is also the Hibiscus Sporting Complex and the Mount Gravatt PCYC on the same road.

References

External links

 

Suburbs of the City of Brisbane